CgeTV was a user-generated video channel and current internet video-sharing website created by ABS-CBN Interactive. On cable, CgeTV aired exclusively on SkyCable Digital channel 72.

Programming

CgeTV Programs
In Da Loop (also broadcast on ABS-CBN)(Now moved to Jeepney TV)
 Cge Mishmash
 The Viewing Room
 Let's Sync It!
 Dancesingcredible
 Supercgezen
 Dance Entertainment

Segments of CgeTV In Da Loop
Cute
Usapang Lalake
How2D2
Reporting for Beauty
Your the Star
Sports (on http://cge.tv)

Non CgeTV Programs
It's Showtime (live on CgeTV website only with no commercial breaks) also broadcast on ABS-CBN

Final CgeJock's
Edu Ibazeta (now a vlogger)
DJ ChaCha Balba-Guevarra (Recording Artist/Radio Personality - from Tambayan 101.9 & now currently moved to TV5, ONE PH & Radyo5 92.3 News FM)
Anna Tan (1st winner of Cge Star)
Ashley "Petra Mahalimuyak" Rivera (now moved to GMA 7)
Jobert Austria (now currently a comedian & now currently seen & moved to GMA 7)

See also
PIE Channel
ABS-CBN Interactive

External links

ABS-CBN Digital Media
Philippine entertainment websites
Video hosting
Television channels and stations established in 2010
Television channels and stations disestablished in 2012
Internet properties established in 2010
Internet properties disestablished in 2012
ABS-CBN Corporation channels
Defunct television networks in the Philippines